Hsu Ching-wen and Ksenia Lykina were the defending champions, but both players chose not to participate.

Katy Dunne and Tammi Patterson won the title after defeating Erina Hayashi and Robu Kajitani 6–7(3–7), 6–2, [10–4] in the final.

Seeds

Draw

References
Main Draw

Kurume U.S.E Cup - Doubles
Kurume Best Amenity Cup